Shin Kang-Woo (born April 26, 1992) is a South Korean actor and singer.

Filmography

Films

Television series

Music videos

References

External links
 at The Queen AMC
:ko:%EC%8B%A0%EA%B0%95%EC%9A%B0 at 신강우(관련어)

1992 births
Living people
South Korean male film actors
South Korean male television actors